Edward Winslow Bryant Jr. (August 27, 1945 – February 10, 2017) was an American science fiction and horror writer sometimes associated with the Dangerous Visions series of anthologies that bolstered The New Wave. At the time of his death, he resided in North Denver.

Life and work

Bryant was born in White Plains, New York, but raised on a cattle ranch in Wyoming. He attended school in Wheatland, Wyoming, and received his MA in English from the University of Wyoming in 1968.

During the 1950s his uncle, a rodeo star, encouraged his love of film. This perhaps ultimately led to his occasional work in screenplays and as an actor. He was in the films The Laughing Dead (1988) and Ill Met by Moonlight (1994).

His writing career began in 1968 with his attendance at the Clarion Workshop. At the beginning of his career he developed an association with Harlan Ellison, which led to collaborative efforts such as the novel Phoenix Without Ashes, based on Ellison's pilot script for The Starlost.

He won two Nebula Awards for his short stories, "Stone" (1978) and "giANTS" (1979). He was mostly known as a writer of short fiction; however, he also wrote poetry, nonfiction, reviews, criticism, and edited an e-zine. His short horror story "Dark Angel", which appeared in Kirby McCauley's anthology Dark Forces, featured modern-day witch Angela Black. She reappears as the narrator of Bryant's short novel Fetish.

When Bryant moved to Denver in 1972, he founded the Northern Colorado Writers Workshop, which continues today, and has produced a number of notable writers, including Steve Rasnic Tem, Melanie Tem, John Dunning, Wil McCarthy, Bruce Holland Rogers, Dan Simmons, and Connie Willis. Bryant was a senior editor of Wormhole Books. In addition, he facilitated a number of other writing workshops over the years for writers ranging in skill and experience from amateur to professional.

Edward Bryant served as Toastmaster for Denvention II, the 1981 Worldcon, as well as World Fantasy Convention, ArmadilloCon, TusCon, and Death Equinox. He also chaired (and otherwise was a special guest at) for multiple years at the World Horror Convention.

Illness and death

In 2010, various writers & editors including Melanie Tem and Ellen Datlow set up a Crowd-funding page to help Bryant deal with financial emergencies brought on by his ongoing fight against the effects of Type 1 diabetes.

Bryant died at his home in Colorado on February 10, 2017, after a long illness. He was 71.

Works

Novels 

 Phoenix Without Ashes (1975, with Harlan Ellison). An adaptation of Harlan Ellison's pilot script for The Starlost

Mosaic novels 

Wild Cards series
 Bantam Books #1. Wild Cards (1987). Story "Down Deep" (with Leanne C. Harper)
 Bantam Books #3. Jokers Wild (1987). Segments with the character "Sewer Jack"
 Bantam Books #4. Aces Abroad (1988). Story "Down in the Dreamtime"
 Bantam Books #5. Down and Dirty (1988). Story "The Second Coming of Buddy Holly"
 Bantam Books #11. Dealer's Choice (1992). Segments with the character "Wyungare"

Short story collections 

 Among the Dead and Other Events Leading Up to the Apocalypse (1973). Contains 17 short stories:
 "The Hanged Man" (1972)
 "Shark"
 "No. 2 Plain Tank Auxiliary Fill Structural Limit 17,605 lbs. Fuel-PWA Spec. 522 Revised" (1972)
 "Adrift on the Freeway" (1970)
 "Jody After the War" (1972)
 "Teleidoscope"
 "The Poet in the Hologram in the Middle of Prime Time" (1972)
 "The Human Side of the Village Monster" (1971)
 "Among the Dead" (1971)
 "File on the Plague" (1971)
 "The Soft Blue Bunny Rabbit Story" (1971)
 "Tactics"
 "Sending the Very Best" (1970)
 "Their Thousandth Season" (1972)
 "Love Song of Herself" (1971)
 "Pinup"
 "Dune's Edge" (1972)
 Cinnabar (1976). Contains 8 short stories:
 "The Road to Cinnabar" (1971)
 "Jade Blue" (1971)
 "Gray Matters", AKA "Their Thousandth Season" (1972)
 "The Legend of Cougar Lou Landis" (1973)
 "Hayes and the Heterogyne" (1974). Novelette
 "Years Later"
 "Sharking Down" (1975). Novelette
 "Brain Terminal" (1975). Novelette
 Wyoming Sun (1980). Contains 5 short stories:
 "Prairie Sun"
 "giANTS" (1979)
 "Teeth Marks" (1979)
 "Beyond the Sand River Range" (1972)
 "Strata". Novelette
 Particle Theory (1981). Contains 12 short stories:
 "Particle Theory" (1977)
 "The Thermals of August". Novelette
 "Hayes and the Heterogyne" (1974). Novelette
 "Teeth Marks" (1979)
 "Winslow Crater" (1978). Poem
 "Shark" (1973)
 "Precession" (1980)
 "Stone" (1978)
 "Strata" (1980). Novelette
 "The Hibakusha Gallery" (1977)
 "giANTS" (1979)
 "To See" (1980)
 Neon Twilight (1990). Contains 3 short stories:
 "Waiting in Crouched Halls" (1970)
 "Pilots of the Twilight" (1984). Novelette
 "Neon"
 Darker Passions (1992). Contains 3 short stories:
 "Doing Colfax" (1987)
 "The Loneliest Number" (1990)
 "Human Remains"
 The Baku: Tales of the Nuclear Age (2001). Contains 3 short stories:
 "The Baku" (1987). Novelette
 "The Hibakusha Gallery" (1977)
 "Jody After the War" (1972)
 Trilobyte (2014). Contains 3 short stories:
 "An Easter Treasure" (1987)
 "Coon Dawgs" (1987)
 "Drummer's Star" (1987)
 Predators and Other Stories (2014). Contains 6 short stories:
 "Predators" (1987)
 "The Baku" (1987). Novelette
 "Frat Rat Bash" (1987)
 "Haunted" (1987)
 "Buggage" (1987)
 "Doing Colfax" (1987)

Short stories 

Uncollected short stories.

 "In the Silent World" (1970)
 "They Only Come in Dreams" (1970)
 "Eyes of Onyx" (1971)
 "Her Lover's Name Was Death" (1971)
 "The Lurker in the Locked Bedroom" (1971)
 "Audition: Soon to Be a Major Production" (1972)
 "Beside Still Waters" (1972, with James Sutherland)
 "Darling, When You Hurt Me" (1972)
 "Nova Morning" (1972, with Jody Harper)
 "The 10:00 Report is Brought to You By ..." (1972)
 "2.46593" (1973)
 "Nightmare Syndrome" (1973)
 "Paths" (1973)
 "And Then He Died" (1974)
 "Cowboys, Indians" (1974)
 "Going West" (1974)
 "Xenofreak/Xenophobe" (1975)
 "Kicks Are For Kids" (1978)
 "Dark Angel" (1980)
 "We'll Have Such a Good Time, Lover" (1980)
 "This Is the Way the World Ends, Soggily" (1981)
 "Freezing to Death" (1982)
 Angie Black series:
 In the Shade (1982)
 Armageddon Between Sets (1984)
 Fetish (1991). Novelette
 "Bean Bag Cats®" (1983)
 "Dancing Chickens" (1984)
 "Party Time" (1984)
 "The Man of the Future" (1984)
 "The Serrated Edge" (1984)
 "The Man Who Always Wanted to Travel" (1985)
 "The Overly Familiar" (1985)
 "Presents of Mind" (1986, with Connie Willis, Steve Rasnic Tem, Dan Simmons)
 "The Transfer" (1986)
 "Author's Notes" (1987)
 "A Functional Proof of Immortality" (1988)
 "Chrysalis" (1988)
 "Skin and Blood" (1988)
 "The Cutter" (1988)
 "While She Was Out" (1988)
 "A Sad Last Love at the Diner of the Damned" (1989). Novelette
 "Good Kids" (1989)
 "Mod Dogs" (1989)
 "'Saurus Wrecks" (1989)
 "Dying Is Easy, Comedy Is Hard" (1990, with Dan Simmons). Novelette
 "Slippage" (1990)
 "Colder Than Hell" (1991)
 "Country Mouse" (1991)
 "Down Home" (1991)
 "The Great Steam Bison of Cycad Center" (1991). Novelette
 "Aqua Sancta" (1993)
 "The Fire That Scours" (1994)
 "Big Dogs, Strange Days" (1995)
 "Calling the Lightning by Name" (1995)
 "Flirting with Death" (1995)
 "Raptured Up in Blue" (1995)
 "Disillusion" (1996)
 "Talkin' Trailer Trash" (1996)
 "Ashes on Her Lips" (1998)
 "Knock" (1998, AKA Ed Bryant)
 "Styx and Bones" (1999)
 "The Clock That Counts the Dead" (1999)
 "The Flicker Man" (1999, with Trey Barker). Novelette
 "The Shuttlecock" (1999). Novelette
 "Mr. Twisted" (2000, AKA Ed Bryant)
 "Everything Broken" (2003)
 "Bad German" (2010)
 "Marginal Hants" (2015)
 "Bitten Off" (2017)
 "War Stories" (unpublished). Novelette

Chapbooks 

 The Man of the Future (1990)
 Fetish (1991)
 The Cutter (1991)
 The Thermals of August (1992)
 Aqua Sancta (1993)
 While She Was Out (2001)

Anthologies 

 2076: The American Tricentennial (1977, with Jo Ann Harper)
 The Shadow on the Doorstep / Trilobyte (1987, with James P. Blaylock)

See also 

 List of horror fiction authors
 splatterpunk

References

External links 

 
 Edward Bryant at FantasticFiction.com
 Edward Bryant at Locus Online

1945 births
2017 deaths
People from White Plains, New York
American horror writers
American science fiction writers
American short story writers
Nebula Award winners
Splatterpunk
University of Wyoming alumni
American male short story writers
American male novelists
Novelists from New York (state)
People from Wheatland, Wyoming